NCEF may refer to:

 National Clearinghouse for Educational Facilities
 Nepalese Children's Education Fund